Red Velvet is a 2012 play by Lolita Chakrabarti, dealing with the biography of the 19th century actor Ira Aldridge and his taking the role of Othello. It premiered at the Tricycle Theatre, London (directed by its new artistic director Indhu Rubasingham) from 11 October to 24 November 2012, with Aldridge played by Adrian Lester. Lester revived his role when the Tricycle Theatre Production collaborated with Kenneth Branagh Company’s season at the West End's Garrick theatre in 2016.   It has since been produced by several theatres in the United States and Canada.

Other productions 
 St. Ann’s Warehouse Theater, Brooklyn Bridge Park, New York City, April 2014
 Shakespeare & Company in Lenox, MA from August 6 through September 13, 2015, with Aldridge played by John Douglas Thompson.
 The Junction Theatre in Los Angeles, CA from March 26 through April 30, 2016, with Aldridge played by Paul Outlaw
 San Francisco Playhouse in San Francisco, CA from May 10 through June 25, 2016, with Aldridge played by Carl Lumbly.
 San Jose Youth Shakespeare at The Historic Hoover Theatre in San Jose, CA from August 12 through August 14, 2016, with Aldridge played by Nathan Sandoval.  Directed by Bob Rumsby.
 Shakespeare Theatre of New Jersey in Madison, NJ from September 7 through September 25, 2016, with Aldridge played by Lindsay Smiling.
 Raven Theatre in Chicago, Il from September 28 through November 27, 2016, with Aldridge played by Brandon Greenhouse.
 Lantern Theatre in Philadelphia, Pa from September 7 through October 8, 2017, with Aldridge played by Forrest McClendon
 Chicago Shakespeare Theater from December 1, 2017, through January 21, 2018, with Aldridge played by Dion Johnstone.
 Ensemble Theatre Cincinnati in Cincinnati, Ohio, from March 6 through March 31, 2018, with Aldridge played by Ken Early.
 OWI (Office of War) Bureau of Theatre Boston, MA   from May 30 to June 16, 2018, with Aldridge played by Seth Hill
 Jewel Theatre in Santa Cruz, CA from January 23 through February 17, 2019, with Aldridge played by Aldo Billingslea. Directed by Bob Rumsby.
Southern Connecticut State University in New Haven, CT from February 28 through March 7, 2020, with Aldridge played by Gary Robinson Jr. and Malcolm Davis
Shakespeare Theatre Company in Washington, DC from June 16th through July 17th, 2022,  with Aldridge played by Amari Cheatom. Directed by Jade King Carroll.

References

2012 plays
Plays based on actual events
West End plays
Plays and musicals based on Othello